Getaway Car may refer to:

 A car used in a crime scene getaway
 "Getaway Car" (Susan Ashton song), 1999, also recorded by 4 Runner, Hall & Oates, and The Jenkins
 "Getaway Car" (Taylor Swift song), 2018
 "Getaway Car", a song by Audioslave from the album Audioslave, 2002
 "Getaway Car", a song by Smash Mouth from the album Summer Girl, 2006
 "Getaway Car", a 2019 song by Carly Rose
 The Getaway Car, a 2016 BBC television series